Ana María de Martínez (nee Avilez) (May 28, 1937 - December 16, 2012) was a Salvadorian artist. She is best known for creating acrylic paintings on canvas. Martinez was a self-taught painter, and her career expanded to almost four decades.

Biography 
On May 28, 1937, Ana María Avilés was born in Santa Ana, El Salvador. She was the fourth child of Maruca de Avilés and Narciso Avilés and the younger sister of Salvadoran painter San Aviles (1932–1991).  In 1943, the Avilés family moved to the capital, San Salvador. In 1959, at the age of twenty-two, she married Oswaldo Martínez, an architect.

A deep religious feeling and a vocation to art led her to the workshop of a French sculptor visiting San Salvador, who invited her to take modelling classes. The use of clay, the traditional material of the Central American ancestral cultures, aroused her interest in pre-Columbian art, leading her to visit archaeological sites in El Salvador, Guatemala, Honduras, Mexico, and Belize.

Moved by Mayan art and culture, Martínez established a dialogue with her ancestors, thus discovering her means of expression and using painting as a vehicle for her plastic language. A pictorial work anchored in these links with the past and translated into forty-four works with Mayan themes. In 1976, at the age of thirty-nine, she carried out her first exhibition.

Martinez, later on, moved towards folkloric themes, reflecting the cottage-core aesthetic in a style of marked naif accent. Six of her paintings were auctioned at Sotheby's in New York. From 1983 to 1984, symbolic characters, walls and insects (like the honeybee) grabbed her attention due to their industriousness and order, creating still lives.

From 1985 to 1989, she moved within a thematic romanticism of a strange nature. She mixed elements of considerable realism with dreamlike elements, taken from fantasies.

She received an invitation from the Italian government to participate in the Spoletto Art Festival "Dei Due Mondi" in 1986. The success was immediate. Martínez said, "after that experience, I was never the same again, it influenced me so much that I traveled again to study; I returned to museums, to galleries, which I had already visited".

Martínez also illustrated Salvadorian poet Claudia Lars's book “Tierra de Infancia”.

After 1989, Martinez entered another artistic stage, which she herself called "Theaters." During this stage, she combined the theme, definitely in the line of the still life, with the refined technique that she had developed by force of study and work. In relation to this, she sensed what she wanted, she knew that her brother, Ernesto, had managed to create an impeccable painting, but ... "I cried because I did not know how to do it, I knew what I wanted, but not how to do it. I prepared my fabrics, and then I was painting with waxes, with means that emerged from my investigations, and then I gave it what I call the finish, the last thing I do is a wax mixed with acrylic and other chemical materials, it is a big little secret that I keep."

Artistic periods 
Her work is often compared to the Dutch Masters of the 17th century for her mastery of light and the art of chiaroscuro, the technique of contrasting light and shade in order to enhance shape, form, texture, and transparency.

Oranges—her indisputable object of artistic focus—center in most of her current paintings due to their unmistakable multicolored tones that Ana Maria plays with. 

Primitive Period

Martínez began her career in the late 1960s, in what is known in Spanish as her "Epoca Primitiva", which roughly translates to "Primitive Period" which began after she participated in a clay modeling course sponsored by the French embassy in San Salvador (1967–1968). Here, she made casts and polychrome pourings using many techniques, including encaustics, which she would later use in paintings, combined with other contemporary techniques and materials. It was during this time that Ana Maria, inspired by Mayan and Colonial art, began the search for a style of her own where she could begin to express her message of "spiritual peace and the joy of living". She focuses on regional landscapes and the traditions of Salvadoran folklore and its surroundings—fields of flowers and scenes with great architectonic ideas—all executed with great precision. In this period, which carried on until around 1982, she evolved very quickly, blending colors with the magic of the artist.

Period of Walls

In the next period (1983–1984), known in Spanish as the "Epoca de Muros" (Roughly translating into "Period of Walls") Martínez sought to evolve with other concepts and paints works which always contain walls—with which she expressed the technical difficulties that she needed to overcome. She used many animals during this time, mainly bees, which, in an ironic play of events in life, foreshadows a tragic event she would endure next to her husband.

Romantic Period

The "Romantic Period" (1986–1989), known as the "Epoca Romantica" in Spanish, follows, where Martínez lets go of her casual primitivism and ventures inside the creation of harmonious and sophisticated shapes and forms. Her compositions blend high-reality elements with flowers, fruits, and volcanoes. Her artwork is published to reflect the poetry of Salvadorean poet, Claudia Lars (actual name Carmen Brannon) in Tierra de Infancia. 

Final Period, the Current Period

The "Current Period" began in the early 1990s, when Martínez had been developing a novel technique using acrylic colors and wax, enabling her to paint images of excellent transparency and accomplish that unique finishing. In her paintings of modern "still life" and other compositions, Martínez wished to express the abundance of this world at this point in time: the growth of people, traffic, the high production, lights, sounds, and everything that affects people in their ordinary lives.

Recognition 

Martínez's artwork was made a part of the permanent collection of the Nassau County Museum of Art in New York in January 2010. "Teatro de Naranjas (Theater of Oranges) (1991) by Salvadoran Ana Maria de Martinez lives up to its title by presenting the subject matter of still life in a highly theatrical way"

Alongside her artistic career, Martínez has received acknowledgments of her work, such as "Distinguished Visitor" by the mayor of Miami, Florida, USA; "Certificate of Appreciation" by the city of Coral Gables, Florida, USA for her participation in the development of art and culture. Moreover, her work has been successfully auctioned at prestigious galleries worldwide, such as Sotheby's and Christie's New York, among others.

Sale of "Theater of Oranges" at Christie's New York: Thursday, May 19, 1994 [Lot 250] in LATIN AMERICAN PAINTINGS, DRAWINGS, SCULPTURE AND PRINTS
Sale of "Mandarines" at Christie's New York: Wednesday, May 17, 1995 [Lot 249] in Important Latin American Paintings, Drawings & Sculpture
Sale of "Dead Nature with Oranges and Grapes" at Christie's New York: Tuesday, November 21, 1995 [Lot 257] in Important Latin American Paintings, Drawings & Sculpture

Her works reside in museums and collections, such as the Duchess of Alba collection in Spain, the private collection of former U.S. President Ronald Reagan, the permanent collection of contemporary painters of El Salvador in "Museo Marte" (the National Gallery of El Salvador) where she was featured as the "Artist of the Month" in February 2010, the exhibit "Latinas!" in Jan 2010 to Feb 28 2010, and the NCMA permanent collection, where "Theater of Oranges" has been added to the permanent collection of the Nassau County Museum of Art in New York. In 2007, Ana Maria's work was featured in the Latin Masters exhibition of the Nassau County Museum of Art in New York, alongside other world-renowned artists such as Frida Kahlo and Fernando Botero.

Ana Maria's artwork has also been displayed in university exhibits such as "Exhibition: 'Latin American Modern Masters'" in the University of Pennsylvania, and some of her artwork has been reproduced by UNICEF. Her artwork has been presented in various exhibitions in American (Latin America, USA, and Canada) and European cities. Additionally, the Government of Japan acquired two of her paintings, and in 1986, by invitation of the government of Italy, Ana Maria participated in the Festival "Dei Due Mondi" which takes place every year in the city of Spoleto, Italy.

Death 
Martínez died on December 16 of 2012, at San Salvador, El Salvador.

References

External links
 

1937 births
2012 deaths
20th-century Salvadoran painters
21st-century Salvadoran painters
20th-century women artists
21st-century women artists
People from Santa Ana, El Salvador
Salvadoran women artists